NGC 4845 (also known as NGC 4910) is a spiral galaxy located in the constellation Virgo around 65 million light years away. The galaxy was originally discovered by William Herschel in 1786. It is a member of the NGC 4753 Group of galaxies, which is a member of the Virgo II Groups, a series of galaxies and galaxy clusters strung out from the southern edge of the Virgo Supercluster.

The galaxy has a supermassive black hole at its center with a mass of 300,000. In 2013, the ESA observed the black hole absorbing matter from a nearby, low-mass object; possibly a brown dwarf star. The observed X-ray flare was caught by the ESA's INTEGRAL telescope.

Gallery

References

External links

 

Virgo (constellation)
Unbarred spiral galaxies
4845
8087
044392